Skyjacked is a 1972 American disaster film directed by John Guillermin. The film stars Charlton Heston, James Brolin and Yvette Mimieux, along with an ensemble cast primarily playing the roles of passengers and crew aboard an airliner. Skyjacked is based on the David Harper novel Hijacked.

This was the last of actress Jeanne Crain's 64 films. It was the film debut for several actors and actresses, including Susan Dey and Roosevelt "Rosey" Grier.

Skyjacked explores the personal dramas and interactions that develop among the story's characters during a crisis that is endangering all of their lives.

Plot
During a routine flight to Minneapolis, a passenger (Susan Dey) aboard Global Airways Flight 502, a Boeing 707, discovers a bomb threat written in lipstick on the mirror of a first-class bathroom. Captain Hank O'Hara (Charlton Heston) believes it to be a hoax, but when a second handwritten threat is left on a stewardess's serving tray he is convinced to take the cryptic threats seriously and follows the instructions -- "Bomb on plane divert to Anchorage, Alaska. No Joke, No Tricks. Death"—by changing course for Alaska. To avoid an explosive decompression if a bomb goes off, he flies at lower altitude, increasing fuel consumption.

The captain ignores a warning by a passenger, a jazz cellist (Roosevelt Grier), that he suspects his erratically behaving seatmate, Sgt. Jerome K. Weber (James Brolin), to be the hijacker. The weather at Anchorage is so poor, a United States Air Force ground-controlled approach specialist (Claude Akins) is called in. His radar shows a small aircraft with radio failure that is approaching the same runway, but Flight 502 has too little fuel to go around. O'Hara sees the other aircraft at the last moment and manages to avoid a collision and land safely.

Once on the ground, passengers attempt to disarm Weber, a Vietnam veteran driven insane by war trauma. Whether he has a bomb or not, Weber is certainly armed with guns and grenades and manages to fight off an attempt by other passengers to disarm him and threatens to detonate a grenade in his hand if anyone attempts to interfere with his plans.

Weber is taken to the cockpit where he demands the aircraft be refueled. While the hijacker is occupied in assuming control, the lead stewardess (Yvette Mimieux) oversees the escape of the economy-class passengers by emergency slide. Weber becomes outraged but allows the remaining passengers and three stewardesses to leave. He keeps the remaining crew as hostages, and most of the first-class passengers, including a U.S. Senator (Walter Pidgeon) and a pregnant woman (Mariette Hartley) who has gone into premature labor due to the crisis. A federal agent tries to slip on board, but is caught by Weber and becomes another hostage. Weber demands to be flown to Moscow, where he intends to defect to the Soviet Union.

Although the Soviets deny clearance into their airspace, the increasingly agitated Weber forces the pilots to continue on. As they enter Soviet airspace, O'Hara orders that the landing gear and flaps be lowered to a full landing configuration and broadcasts their situation to Soviet ground control. The aircraft is surrounded by Soviet fighter jets who eventually escort the plane to the Moscow airport. The hijacked airliner is allowed to land at Moscow, but ordered to stop short of the terminal as armed soldiers surround the plane.

The remaining crew and passengers are finally released, leaving O'Hara and Weber as the last ones on board. Weber, who had nursed fantasies of being received by the Soviets as a hero, is jubilant to have seemingly achieved his dreams and gloats to O'Hara that he never even possessed a bomb. When he realizes the Soviet forces are surrounding the aircraft to attack him and not welcome him, he straps on a bandolier of grenades and prepares to open fire. When O'Hara tries to intervene, Weber shoots him and leads the captain down the airstair to the landing strip. As the soldiers prepare to fire and Weber pulls a pin from a grenade, O'Hara manages to push the hijacker away from him. Weber is shot and lands on his own grenade which detonates killing him instantly. O'Hara survives, and he is placed on a stretcher. As he gazes skyward, he smiles with relief, spotting another aircraft that has departed.

Cast
As first billed:

Production

Between 1961 and 1973, nearly 160 hijackings took place in American airspace. David Harper's novel Hijacked was published in 1970.

Film rights were bought by Walter Seltzer. The star was Charlton Heston, who had made four films with Seltzer.

Under the working titles Hijacked and Airborne, principal photography took place from early January to early March 1972. With the emphasis on an aeronautic incident, the production obtained a World Airways Boeing 707 (N374WA) to play the part of the "Global Airways" airliner. With 90% of the filming done inside a 707, Charlton Heston compared his work there to what director Alfred Hitchcock had achieved in filming Lifeboat (1944). Current Air National Guard operational North American F-100 Super Sabres of the 188th Fighter Squadron were repainted as the Soviet interceptors. Oakland International Airport was used for the airport scenes.

Filming took place in early 1972. Charlton Heston wrote about the experience in his diary:
January 4: I've never done a film with so many scenes I wasn't in. Still there was the 707, all becrewed and passengered. I did get a chance to try my uniform on. I look OK...January 5:...My first scene today consisted of walking out of the cockpit and into the can. Very demanding bit of emoting there. January 20: The opening shots went well, John Guillermin utilizing his talent for richly textured full shots, most with a moving camera. He provided a good introductory scene for me. I'm beginning to realize this is not a rich role, of course. Nonetheless, if the film comes off, it'll help me. I'm beginning to think it will, too...Skyjacked looks surprisingly good, I was relieved to see...It seems very tight. A pleasure for a change to be in a film that runs under two hours...it's been some time."

Reception

Critical

Filmink called it "is a solid piece of classical entertainment which is one of the best movies made at MGM under the regime of James Aubrey...Charlton Heston was born to play a pilot."

Paul Mavis writing for Movies & Drinks appreciated its non-glossy approach to the disaster genre: "This is a straightforward, simple, mean little suspense thriller, extremely well-told by director John Guillermin and screenwriter Stanley R. Greenberg, and unpretentiously unembellished."

Box office
The film was profitable. It was one of MGM's bigger hits of 1972, along with Shaft and Kansas City Bomber.

See also
 List of American films of 1972

References
Notes

Citations

Bibliography

 Eames, John Douglas. The MGM Story: The Complete History of Fifty Roaring Years. London: Octopus Books Limited, 1982, First edition 1979. .

External links
 North American F-100 Super Sabre
 
 
 
 

1972 films
1970s action films
1970s disaster films
American action films
American aviation films
American disaster films
Films about aircraft hijackings
Films about aviation accidents or incidents
Films based on American novels
Films directed by John Guillermin
Films scored by Perry Botkin Jr.
Films set on airplanes
Films set in Moscow
Metro-Goldwyn-Mayer films
1970s English-language films
1970s American films